Cambridge International School was a private mixed non-selective international school for children aged 11 to 16 located in Cambridge, England. It was owned by Dr Harriet Sturdy. The school was founded in 2006 and located to Cherry Hinton Hall in 2007. By 2010, the senior school was relocated to The Temple in Little Abington.  In 2019, the school split with the Junior school now under different ownership and changing its name to Oaks International School.

As an international school, it used English as the primary medium of instruction for students, but also operated a mother-tongue programme of first language study. Students in the Senior School studied towards a programme of IGCSEs, but also took GCSEs.  In 2018, the school's GCSE results placed them 10th in the entire UK for small independent schools.  Students had a variety of clubs they could participate in after school, including the option to participate in the Duke of Edinburgh's Award scheme.

The school closed in 2021.

References

External links
Cambridge International School official website

Defunct schools in Cambridgeshire
Educational institutions established in 2006
2006 establishments in England
Schools in Cambridge
Educational institutions disestablished in 2021
2021 disestablishments in England